CPO (an abbreviation of Capital Punishment Organization) was an American hip hop group from Compton, California, founded in 1989 by rapper Vince "Lil' Nation" Edwards and DJ Clarence "D.J. Train" Lars, and enlisted  producer Daron "Young D" Sapp shortly thereafter. Fellow rapper Granville "The Chip" Moton was one-time member of the group.

They released a single album in 1990, To Hell and Black, which included production from MC Ren of N.W.A. and was distributed by Capitol Records. To Hell and Black peaked at No. 33 on the Top R&B/Hip-Hop Albums Billboard charts.

DJ Train, who had worked mostly with MC Ren and J. J. Fad, died of smoke inhalation in a house fire on July 26, 1994.

Lil' Nation has since begun identifying himself as (Tha) Boss Hogg, or "CPO" in the singular form. CPO Boss Hogg continues to make rap appearances, including the 1994 original soundtrack to Above the Rim, hyphy artist E-A-Ski on his 1998 album, and the 2000 self-titled album by Tha Eastsidaz.

Discography
To Hell and Black (1990)

References

External links

Hip hop groups from California
Musical groups established in 1989
Musical groups disestablished in 1994
Musical groups from Los Angeles
Priority Records artists
Gangsta rap groups